An Irish Goodbye is a 2022 short film written, produced, and directed by Tom Berkeley and Ross White. The film stars James Martin, Seamus O'Hara, Paddy Jenkins and Michelle Fairley.

Summary 
The film is a black comedy set on a rural farm in Glenmornan, a small hamlet in the west of County Tyrone in Northern Ireland.

Turlough is estranged from his brother Lorcan, who has Down syndrome. After their mother, Grainne, dies from an illness, Turlough returns to the family farm from London in order to sell the property and drive Lorcan to live with their aunt, but Lorcan refuses. The local priest, Father O'Shea, produces a list of "bucket list" items that the brothers' mother had written before her death, but Turlough insists that it is useless now. Turlough later fights with Lorcan about Lorcan's desire to stay taking care of the farm. The next morning, Turlough prepares to drive Lorcan away, but Lorcan refuses to leave until they've fulfilled all of Grainne's "bucket list," which is 100 items long. Turlough reluctantly agrees, and the brothers spend time with Grainne's urn of ashes, happily bonding once more as they "help Grainne" model for a painting, fly with balloons, and smoke marijuana. However, when Lorcan breaks the urn in order to fulfill the 99th item on the list, "skydiving", Turlough becomes upset and insists that this is the reason Lorcan can't be trusted with the farm, and he officially puts the property up for sale.

As Turlough prepares to finally move Lorcan out, he is greeted by Father O'Shea, who reveals with surprise that he had never given Lorcan the bucket list. Turlough confronts Lorcan, and though Lorcan apologizes for lying to Turlough about the list, Turlough instead suggests that they finish the list by fulfilling the 100th item, "going to space." They send up Grainne's ashes with fireworks, and as they recline by a bonfire, Lorcan adds a 101th item on the list: the wish that he and Turlough become best friends again, and that Turlough will leave London to return to help with the family farm. Turlough agrees to consider the option.

Accolades 
The film won the 2023 Academy Award for Best Live Action Short Film and won Best Short Film at the 76th British Academy Film Awards.

References

External links 

2022 films
2022 short films
Down syndrome in film
Northern Irish films
British short films
Irish short films
Live Action Short Film Academy Award winners
Black comedy films
BAFTA winners (films)